Calatagan, officially the Municipality of Calatagan,  is a 2nd class municipality in the province of Batangas, Philippines. According to the 2020 census, it has a population of 58,719 people.

Calatagan comprises the Calatagan Peninsula between the South China Sea and Balayan Bay. The peninsula's near white sand beaches are well-known vacation and leisure sites. There are several beach resorts including the Banak House Calatagan on Calatagan beach, the Ronco Beach Resort in barangay Bagong Silang, Playa Calatagan in barangay Santa Ana, the Golden Sunset Resort in barangay Uno, Lago de Oro Resort in barangay Balibago, Villa Agustina in barangay Bagong Silang, and Nacua Sea Park in barangay Quilitisan. Calatagan was formerly titled as the Forbes Park of the South, because of the rich families who own estates here.

An extremely rare example of pre-Spanish Philippine script was found in Calatagan. The script is called Baybayin in Tagalog, and was derived from Javanese writing, which in turn is derived from Brahmi. This writing survived on an earthenware burial jar dated to the 13th or 14th century. A Spanish lighthouse can also be found at Cape Santiago at the peninsula's southern tip dating back to the 1890s and is also one of the municipality's main tourist attractions.

Etymology
The word "Calatagan" is taken from the Tagalog word "latag" and is closely associated with "kapatagan", which means a vast portion of flat land lying between the hills and mountains. Thus, Calatagan means a large expanse of wide flat land.

History
The town is the site of the historically and archaeologically famous Calatagan Excavation whose antique pottery and utensils contributed important facts about the culture and activities of the Filipinos before the coming of the Spaniards. Chinese pottery, unearthed from six large cemeteries by archaeologists Olov T.R Jones and Robert B. Fox led to a conclusion made by H. Otley Beyer which points out the existence of a sizable pre-Spanish population in the town. The same studies suggested that there were direct Chinese trade by water in Calatagan and centered at a place called Balong-Bato, wherein an entrance through the reef, which surrounds Calatagan, is still presently used by vessels coming from Mindoro and Manila.
 
The land occupied by the municipality of Calatagan was acquired by Domingo Roxas from the Spanish Crown in 1829 and was called Hacienda de Calatagan. The successors Pedro P. Roxas and Antonio R. Roxas continued to develop it.

In 1912, through Executive Order No. 78 by then Governor-General William Cameron Forbes, Calatagan became a municipality independent from its mother municipality, Balayan.
 
In 1931, Carmen Roxas, the last heir of the Roxas Clan transferred ownership of the Hacienda to the Zobel brothers, Jacobo and Alfonso. During the time of the Zobels, the hacienda came to be known as Central Azucarera de Calatagan or simply "Central Carmen" when referring to the sugar milling complex.
 
In 1934, the barangays of Baha and Talibayog, which were parts of Balayan at the time, were annexed to Calatagan since surveys showed that they are part of the land titled to the original owner of Hacienda Calatagan. This added a big area to the municipality.
 
On October 28, 1957, a decade after the Philippines gained independence from the Americans, the Land Tenure Administration, upon petition of the people of Calatagan bought the Hacienda Lands from the Zobels.

Geography

According to the Philippine Statistics Authority, the municipality has a land area of  constituting  of the  total area of Batangas.

Barangays
Calatagan is politically subdivided into 25 barangays.

Climate

Demographics

In the 2020 census, Calatagan had a population of 58,719.

Economy

Gallery

References

External links

 
 [ Philippine Standard Geographic Code]

Municipalities of Batangas
Beaches of the Philippines